Pratica di Mare Air Base  is a military airport of the Italian Air Force, located in Pomezia, Lazio, southwest of Rome. It was first opened in 1937, and in 1957, it was named after Colonnello Mario de Bernardi. It is one of the largest Italian air bases.

The base houses a "Dragon Star" Airborne Multi-Intelligence Laboratory (a modified Gulfstream III) used for ISTAR.

References

External links
 

Italian airbases